East Laurens High School is a public high school located in East Dublin, Georgia, United States. The school is part of the Laurens County School District, which serves Laurens County. (2017–18)-

References

External links

 East Laurens High School
 Laurens County School District

Schools in Laurens County, Georgia
Public high schools in Georgia (U.S. state)
Georgia Accrediting Commission